The Nisga’a  (Niska), often formerly spelled Nishga and spelled in the Nisga'a language as  (pronounced ), are an Indigenous people of Canada in British Columbia. They reside in the Nass River valley of northwestern British Columbia. The origin of the term Niska is uncertain. The spelling "Nishga" is used by the Nishga Tribal Council, and some scholars claim that the term means "people of the Nass River."

The official languages of Nisg̱a’a are the Nisg̱a’a language and English.

Nisga’a culture

Society
Nisga’a society is organized into four tribes:
 Ganhada (G̱anada, Raven)
 Gispwudwada (Gisḵ’aast, Killer Whale)
 Laxgibuu (Lax̱gibuu, Wolf)
 Laxsgiik (Lax̱sgiik, Eagle)

Each tribe is further sub-divided into house groups – extended families with same origins. Some houses are grouped together into clans – grouping of Houses with same ancestors. Example:

Lax̱gibuu Tribe (Wolf Tribe)
 Gitwilnaak’il Clan (People Separated but of One)
 House of Duuḵ
 House of K’eex̱kw
 House of Gwingyoo

Traditional cuisine
The Nisga’a traditionally harvest "beach food" all year round. This might include razor clams, mussels, oysters, limpets, scallops, abalone, fish, seaweed and other seafood that can be harvested from the shore. They also harvest salmon, cod, char, pike, trout and other fresh water fish from the streams, and hunt seals, fish and sea lion. The grease of the oolichan fish (Thaleichthys pacificus) is sometimes traded with other tribes, though nowadays this is more usually in a ceremonial context. They hunt mountain goat, marmot, game birds and more in the forests. The family works together to cook and process the meat and fish, roasting or boiling the former. They eat fish and sea mammals in frozen, boiled, dried or roasted form. The heads of a type of cod, often gathered half-eaten by sharks, are boiled into a soup that, according to folklore, helps prevent colds. The Nisga′a also trade dried fish, seal oil, fish oil, blubber and cedar.

Traditional houses
The traditional houses of the Nisga’a are shaped as large rectangles, made of cedar planks with cedar shake roofs, and oriented with the doors facing the water. The doors are usually decorated with the family crest. Inside, the floor is dug down to hold the hearth and conserve temperature. Beds and boxes of possessions are placed around the walls. Prior to the mid twentieth century, around three to four extended families might live in one house: this is nowadays an uncommon practice. Masks and blankets might decorate the walls.

Traditional clothing 
Prior to European colonisation, men wore nothing in the summer, normally the best time to hunt and fish. Women wore skirts made of softened cedar bark and went topless. During the colder season, men wore cedar bark skirts (shaped more like a loincloth), a cape of cedar bark, and a basket hat outside in the rain, but wore nothing inside the house. Women wore basket hats and cedar blankets indoors and outdoors. Both sexes made and wore shell and bone necklaces. They rubbed seal blubber into their hair, and men kept their hair long or in a top knot. During warfare, men wore red cedar armour, a cedar helmet, and cedar loincloths. They wielded spears, clubs, harpoons, bows and slings. Wicker shields were common.

Geography

Approximately 2,000 people live in the Fudhu Valley. Another 5,000 Nisga’a live elsewhere in Canada, predominantly within the three urban societies noted in the section below.

Nisga'a villages
The Nisga’a people number about 7,000. In British Columbia, the Nisga’a Nation is represented by four villages:

 Gitlaxt'aamiks (formerly New Aiyansh) - nearly 800
 Gitwinksihlkw (formerly Canyon City) - approximately 200
 Lax̱g̱altsʼap (formerly Greenville) - more than 500
 Ging̱olx (formerly Kincolith) - almost 400

Nisga'a diaspora
Many Nisga’a people have moved to cities for their opportunities. Concentrations are found in three urban areas outside traditional Nisga’a territory:

 Terrace
 Prince Rupert/Port Edward
 Vancouver - there are approximately 1,500 Nisga'a in Vancouver, and others elsewhere in the Lower Mainland.

Nisga’a calendar/life
The Nisga’a calendar revolves around harvesting of foods and goods used. The original year followed the various moons throughout the year.
 : Like a Spoon (February/March). (Variations of spelling include)
 : To Eat Oolichan (March). The oolichan return to the Nass River the end of February/beginning of March. They are the first food harvested after the winter, which marks the beginning of the harvesting year.
 : To Use Canoes Again (April). The ice begins to break on the river, allowing for canoes to be used again
 : Leaves Are Blooming (May). The leaves begin to flourish once again
 : Sockeye Salmon (June). Sockeye salmon are harvested
 : To Eat Berries (July). various berries are harvested
 : Great Salmon (August). Great amounts of salmon are harvested
 : Trail of the Marmot (September). Small game such as marmots are hunted
 : To Eat Trout (October). Trout are the main staple for this month
 : To Blanket (November). The earth is "Blanketed" with snow
 : To Sit (December). The sun is sitting in one spot
 : To Walk North (January). This time of year, the sun begins to go north again
 : To Blow Around (February). Blow around refers to the amount of wind during this time of year

Treaty

On August 4, 1998, a land-claim was settled between the Nisga’a, the government of British Columbia, and the Government of Canada. Bear Glacier Provincial Park was also created as a result of this agreement. The land-claim's settlement was the first formal treaty signed by a First Nation in British Columbia since the Douglas Treaties in 1854 (Vancouver Island) and Treaty 8 in 1899 (northeastern British Columbia). The land owned collectively is under internal pressures from the Nisga'a people to turn it over into a system of individual ownership. This would have an effect on the rest of Canada in regards to First Nations lands.

History

The Tseax Cone situated in a valley above and east of the Ksi Sii Aks (formerly Tseax River)]] was the source for an eruption during the 18th century that killed approximately 2,000 Nisga’a people from poisonous volcanic gases.

Government
The government bodies of the Nisgaʼa include the Nisgaʼa Lisims government, the government of the Nisgaʼa Nation, and the Nisgaʼa village governments, one for each of the four Nisgaʼa villages. The Nisgaʼa Lisims government is located in the Nisgaʼa Lisims Government Building in Gitlaxt'aamiks.

Museum
In 2011 the Nisg̱aʼa Museum, a project of the Nisga'a Lisims government, opened in Lax̱g̱altsʼap. It contains many historical artifacts of the Nisga'a people returned after many decades in major museums beyond the Nass Valley.

Prominent Nisga’a
 Jordan Abel, poet
 Frank Arthur Calder, Sim'oogit Wii Lisims hereditary chief, treaty negotiator, rights activist, legislator, president emeritus Nisga'a Lisims Government
 Joseph Gosnell, hereditary chief Sim'oogit Hleek, treaty negotiator, former President Nisga'a Lisims Government
 Norman Tait, hereditary chief - Sim'oogit G̱awaaḵ of  Luuya'as, master carver
 Ron Telek, of Laxsgiik  Luuya'as, carver
 Larry McNeil, Tlingit-Nisga'a photographer

See also
 Nisga'a Highway
 Nisga'a Memorial Lava Bed Provincial Park
 School District 92 Nisga'a
 Nisga'a and Haida Crest Poles of the Royal Ontario Museum

References

Further reading 
 Barbeau, Marius (1950) Totem Poles. 2 vols. (Anthropology Series 30, National Museum of Canada Bulletin 119.) Ottawa: National Museum of Canada.
 Boas, Franz, Tsimshian Texts (Nass River Dialect), 1902
 Boas, Franz, Tsimshian Texts (New Series), [1912]
 Morven, Shirley (ed.) (1996) From Time before Memory. New Aiyansh, B.C.: School District No. 92 (Nisga’a).
 Bryant, Elvira C. (1996) Up Your Nass. Church of Religious Research.
 Collison, W. H. (1915) In the Wake of the War Canoe: A Stirring Record of Forty Years' Successful Labour, Peril and Adventure amongst the Savage Indian Tribes of the Pacific Coast, and the Piratical Head-Hunting Haida of the Queen Charlotte Islands, British Columbia. Toronto: Musson Book Company. Reprinted by Sono Nis Press, Victoria, B.C. (ed. by Charles Lillard), 1981.
 Dean, Jonathan R. (1993) "The 1811 Nass River Incident: Images of First Conflict on the Intercultural Frontier." Canadian Journal of Native Studies, vol. 13, no. 1, pp. 83–103.
 "Fur Trader, A" (Peter Skene Ogden) (1933) Traits of American Indian Life and Character. San Francisco: Grabhorn Press. Reprinted, Dover Publications, 1995. (Ch. 4 is the earliest known description of a Nisga'a feast.)
 McNeary, Stephen A. (1976) Where Fire Came Down: Social and Economic Life of the Niska. Ph.D. dissertation, Bryn Mawr College, Bryn Mawr, Penn.
 Patterson, E. Palmer, II (1982) Mission on the Nass: The Evangelization of the Nishga (1860-1890). Waterloo, Ontario: Eulachon Press.
 Raunet, Daniel (1996) Without Surrender, without Consent: A History of the Nisga’a Land Claims. Revised ed. Vancouver: Douglas and McIntyre.
 Rose, Alex (2000) Spirit Dance at Meziadin: Chief Joseph Gosnell and the Nisga’a Treaty. Madeira Park, B.C.: Harbour Publishing.
 Roth, Christopher F. (2002) "Without Treaty, without Conquest: Indigenous Sovereignty in Post-Delgamuukw British Columbia." Wíčazo Ša Review, vol. 17, no. 2, pp. 143–165.
 Sapir, Edward (1915) "A Sketch of the Social Organization of the Nass River Indians." Anthropological Series, no. 7. Geological Survey, Museum Bulletin, no. 19. Ottawa: Government Printing Office. (Online version at the Internet Archive)
 Sterritt, Neil J., et al. (1998) Tribal Boundaries in the Nass Watershed. Vancouver: U.B.C. Press.

External links

 Nisg̱a’a Lisims Government
 School District 92 (Nisga’a)
 Gitmax̱mak’ay Nisga’a Prince Rupert/Port Edward Society
 Ging̱olx website
 Nisga’a People of the Rainbow
 Nisga'a Museum
 Nass River Indians Movie, Canadianfilm

 
Nass Country
North Coast of British Columbia